"I Guess I'll Have to Cry, Cry, Cry" is a song written and performed by James Brown. Released as a single in 1968, it charted #15 R&B and #55 Pop.

This song is noted as the last single by Brown to give label credit to his vocal group, The Famous Flames. Although they technically stopped singing on Brown's singles in 1964, The Flames, Bobby Byrd, Bobby Bennett, and Lloyd Stallworth, were still together, touring as a live performance group with Brown, and Byrd continued to sing on record with him. In 1968, however, The Flames all left Brown, citing monetary differences, and although Byrd returned 18 months later, the other members never returned. All of Brown's King Records singles from this point on, starting with Say It Loud – I'm Black and I'm Proud, gave him sole label credit.

The Wailers recorded a reggae version of the song under the title "My Cup" on their 1970 album Soul Rebels.

References

James Brown songs
Songs written by James Brown
Bob Marley songs
1968 singles
1968 songs
King Records (United States) singles